Aleksejs Rosļikovs (born 26 February 1984) is a Latvian businessman and politician, vice President of the Latvian United Police Union.

Biography 
From 2004 to 2005, he worked as an orderly, later an inspector, of the Riga regional administration of the State Police. In 2011, he graduated from the business management study program of Turība University.

In 2017, he was elected to the Riga City Council from the Saskaņa party, from which he was expelled in 2019. Until the dismissal of the city council in February 2020, together with Valērijs Petrovs, Vitālijs Dubovs and Vadims Baraņņiks, he worked in the faction of Independent deputies.

He ran for the 2020 Riga City Council election from the Alternative party, but was not elected. In 2021, together with Valērijs Petrovs, he founded the political party "For Stability!", from which list he was elected to the 14th Saeima.

References 

1984 births
Living people
Social Democratic Party "Harmony" politicians
For Stability! politicians
Deputies of the 14th Saeima
Latvian police officers
Latvian businesspeople